It Pays to Advertise may refer to:

 It Pays to Advertise (play), a 1914 farce by Roi Cooper Megrue and Walter Hackett
 It Pays to Advertise (1919 film), an American silent drama film, based on the play
 It Pays to Advertise (1931 film), an American pre-Code comedy film, based on the play
 It Pays to Advertise (1936 film), a Swedish comedy film directed by Anders Henrikson, based on the play
 It Pays to Advertise (Are You Being Served?), an episode of the BBC's British sitcom directed by Bob Spiers.